Freedom Park may refer to:

In the United States
 Freedom Park (Arlington, Virginia), a two block long elevated linear park
 Freedom Park (Atlanta, Georgia), a large city park
 Freedom Park (Charlotte, North Carolina), a large city park
 Freedom Park (Omaha, Nebraska), an outdoor park and museum at the Greater Omaha Marina 
 Miami Freedom Park, a proposed soccer stadium in Miami

In Asia
 Freedom Park (Cambodia), a 1.2-hectare plaza in Phnom Penh
 Freedom Park, Bangalore, the former the Central Jail
 Jayu Park, also known as Freedom Park, a park in Incheon, South Korea

In Africa
 Freedom Park (Lagos), a memorial and leisure park area in the middle of downtown Lagos
 Freedom Park (South Africa), a war memorial in Pretoria
 Freedom Park, North West, an informal housing settlement near the town of Rustenburg

You may be also looking for:
 Freedom park